Countries and territories around the world have enforced lockdowns of varying stringency in response to the COVID-19 pandemic.

Some include total movement control while others have enforced restrictions based on time. In many cases, only essential businesses are allowed to remain open. Schools, universities and colleges have closed either on a nationwide or local basis in  countries, affecting approximately  percent of the world's student population.

Beginning with the first lockdown in China's Hubei province and nationwide in Italy in March, lockdowns continued to be implemented in many countries throughout 2020 and 2021. On 24 March 2020, the entire 1.3 billion population of India was ordered to stay at home during its lockdown, making it the largest of the pandemic. The world's longest continuous lockdown lasting 234 days took place in Buenos Aires, Argentina in 2020. As of October 2021, the city of Melbourne, Australia, and certain cities in Peru and Chile spent the most cumulative days in lockdown over separate periods, although measures varied between these countries.

A few countries and territories did not use the strategy, including Japan, Belarus, Sweden, South Korea, Hong Kong, Taiwan, Tanzania, two states in Brazil and certain United States states.

Countries and territories with lockdowns

Argentina

Australia 

 

A number of Australian states, territories, and cities have implemented lockdowns in response to the pandemic. The country entered a general nationwide lockdown on 23 March 2020 during the first wave of the pandemic, which was lifted on 15 May.

The state of Victoria, particularly its capital city of Melbourne, the country's second most populous city with five million residents, entered an extended lockdown on 7 July 2020 in response to a rapidly growing community outbreak. Initial measures included the closure of all non-essential services, including retail entertainment venues and gyms. Restaurant and bar establishments were permitted to open in take-away and delivery capacities only. Schools and childcare facilities were also ordered to close. Face coverings were made mandatory as of 23 July 2020, with a fine of $200 AUD for non-compliance to those above 12 years of age, although formal exemptions could be acquired. Initially scheduled to last six weeks, restrictions were tightened further on 2 August after cases continued to grow, including a ban on travel further than a five kilometre radius from place of residence, a nighttime curfew of 8pm to 5am, a one-hour limit on outdoor exercise, a one-person per day limit on shopping for essentials, and public gatherings limited to a maximum of two people. Restrictions were progressively eased as the case rate declined, and were completely lifted on 28 October. With a total duration of 112 days, the Victorian lockdown was at the time the longest continuous period of COVID-19 lockdown globally as of October 2020. The lockdown resulted in the state recording zero active cases of COVID-19 in November 2020.

Victoria entered its fourth lockdown on 28 May 2021 in response to an outbreak of the Delta variant. Originally scheduled for seven days, the lockdown was extended to two weeks and lifted on 10 June. Another outbreak of the Delta variant saw Greater Sydney enter lockdown on 26 June 2021, scheduled to last until 16 July, but extended by two weeks on 14 July then until 28 August and the end of September 2021.  Combined with snap lockdowns declared in Brisbane, Perth, and Darwin, more than 12 million people were in lockdown across Australia on 29 June 2021.

Brief "snap lockdowns" in response to new clusters, particularly of the Alpha, Beta, and Delta variants, have been implemented at various times across the country.

Metropolitan Melbourne's 6th lockdown ended in October 2021, with the city spending among the longest amounts of time spent in lockdown in the world.

Austria 

In November 2021, Austria introduced lockdown measures, but only for unvaccinated people, in response to an increase in cases and low vaccination rate. The country introduced a lockdown for all citizens a few days later, making it the first European country to reintroduce such measures in the winter of 2021.

Bangladesh 

On 22 March 2020, Bangladesh announced a ten-day lockdown, starting from 26 March. The lockdown in the country was extended several times to 30 May.

Cambodia 

On 15 April 2021, Cambodia's government enacted a strict stay-at-home order across the entirety of Phnom Penh and Ta Khmau in response to the country's largest COVID-19 outbreak of the pandemic. Certain districts were declared as "red zones", banning people from leaving their homes except for medical emergencies. Sihanoukville also entered a lockdown on 24 April.

Canada 

On 25 January 2020, the first identified presumptive case in Canada was a 56-year-old male who had travelled to Wuhan, China, before returning to Toronto on 22 January. Canada issued a travel advisory against non-essential travel to China due to the outbreak, including a regional travel advisory to avoid all travel to the province of Hubei.

Federal health officials stated that the risk in Canada was low.

On 26 January 2020, Chief Public Health Officer Dr. Theresa Tam tweeted, "There is no clear evidence that this virus is spread easily from person to person. The risk to Canadians remains low."

Three days later, on 29 January, Dr. Tam told Canadians that "It's going to be rare, but we are expecting cases."

On 1 February, the position of the prime minister and the administration remained that it would be discriminatory to exclude travellers from China, the source (and, at the time, still the epicentre) of the disease.

During March, Canadian provinces implemented lockdowns in response to COVID-19.

Ontario, the country's most populous province, had its first provincewide lockdown starting on 26 December 2020. The lockdown was strengthened with a stay-at-home order effective 14 January 2021, and reopened on a regional basis starting 10 February. As a result of the third wave of the COVID-19 pandemic in the province caused by SARS-CoV-2 variants, the government of Ontario once again announced a four-week provincewide shutdown effective 3 April. This shutdown was once again strengthened with another 28-day stay-at-home order starting 8 April, in order to quickly combat the urgent crisis in the province's hospital capacity being caused by the variants.

The city of Toronto, Ontario is considered to have the longest continuous COVID-19 lockdown of any major city in the world.

China

China was the first country to enforce the quarantine and lockdown of cities and later whole provinces in late January 2020. Chinese Communist Party general secretary Xi Jinping said he personally authorized the unprecedented lockdown of Wuhan and other cities beginning on 23 January. Although such measures are a very old tool of epidemic control, their use at the scale of a large city such as Wuhan or the even larger scale of provinces was controversial among experts at the time, with questions about their effectiveness and their ethics. Some public health experts, while not always condemning the measure, raised the issue of the inevitable psychological toll such measures would have. An ex-World Health Organization (WHO) official who headed the organization's Western Pacific Region during the SARS outbreak said that "the containment of a city [hadn't] been done in the history of international public health policy". The WHO called the decision to quarantine Wuhan "new to science". By early April, all lockdowns had ended or relaxed to a certain degree as the cases started to dwindle and the outbreak had come under control.

On March 27, 2022, Shanghai experienced an extended lockdown. Many residents lacked food. On June 1, 2022, Shanghai was returning to normal.

The following cities are currently enforcing lockdown measures; Chengdu, since September 2022 and Guangzhou, since November 2022.

Denmark

Fiji

On 19 March 2020, Fiji confirmed its first case in Lautoka. In response, the Government of Fiji ordered the lockdown of the city on 20 March with closures of all schools and non-essential services all over the country. On 3 April 2020, Fiji's capital, Suva, went into lockdown after confirming two new cases. More than 300,000 residents were confined to their homes and all non-essential services in the city was closed for two weeks.

On 19 April 2021, Nadi and Lautoka went into lockdown after recording its first community transmission in one year. As cases continues to escalate in its second wave, the government has ruled out any possibility of a nationwide lockdown but would focus on targeted lockdowns of communities instead.

France

From 17 March 2020, all people in France were required to complete and carry an exemption form to leave their homes and can be fined for non-essential journeys. Essential journeys include shopping for food, travelling to and from work, accessing healthcare, and exercising within 1 km of the home for up to 1 hour. Police around the country had set up road blocks to check people who were out and about had good reason and that their exemption declarations were in order. These measures were lifted on 11 May 2020, with remaining restrictions on travel further than 100 km away from one's residence. The latter restrictions were lifted on 2 June 2020.

On October 28, president Emmanuel Macron announced a second lockdown to begin on October 30. During this second lockdown, schools remain open and more industries can keep operating (construction, public services...). Like the first lockdown, citizens need to sign their certificates to can go around within 1 km up to hour per day. Fines are 135 euros the 1st time, 200 euros for 2 times within 15 days and 3750 euros and 6 months jail sentence for 3 times within 30 days. This lockdown was replaced by a curfew on December 15, 2020 which was itself abolished on June 20, 2021.

Ghana

India

Indonesia

Large-scale social restrictions

Community Activities Restrictions Enforcement

Iran 

There were night/day curfews put periodically in place in yellow and orange coded regions.

Ireland

On 12 March, Taoiseach Leo Varadkar announced the closure of all schools, colleges and childcare facilities in Ireland until the end of August. On 27 March, Varadkar announced a national stay-at-home order for at least two weeks; the public were ordered to stay at home in all circumstances. All non-essential shops and services, including all pubs, bars, hotels and nightclubs closed and all public and private gatherings of any number of people was banned. The Garda Síochána (Irish police) were given power to enforce the measures, which were repeatedly extended until 18 May.

A roadmap to easing restrictions in Ireland that included five stages was adopted by the government on 1 May 2020 and subsequently published online. The fourth and final phase of easing COVID-19 restrictions in Ireland was initially scheduled to take place on 20 July, but was repeatedly postponed until 31 August at the earliest.

On 7 August, Taoiseach Micheál Martin announced a regional lockdown and a series of measures for counties Kildare, Laois and Offaly following significant increases of COVID-19 cases in the three counties, which came into effect from midnight and will remain in place for two weeks.

On 15 September, the Government announced a medium-term plan for living with COVID-19 that included five levels of restrictions.

All non-essential businesses and services closed and all public and private gatherings of any number of people was banned again on 21 October following the Government's announcement to move the entire country to Level 5 lockdown restrictions for six weeks until 1 December. On 27 November, the Government agreed to ease restrictions from 1 December.

A third wave of COVID-19 arrived in Ireland on 21 December. The Government acted swiftly and on 22 December, Level 5 lockdown restrictions with a number of adjustments were announced, which came into effect from Christmas Eve until 12 January 2021 at the earliest.

All non-essential businesses and services closed and all public and private gatherings of any number of people was banned again on 31 December (New Year's Eve) following the Government's announcement to move the entire country to full Level 5 lockdown restrictions from 30 December until 31 January 2021 at the earliest, in an attempt to get a third surge in cases of COVID-19 under control. On 26 January, the Government extended the Level 5 lockdown restrictions until 5 March. On 23 February, the Government extended the Level 5 lockdown restrictions for another six weeks until 5 April (Easter Monday) at the earliest, while its new revised Living with COVID-19 plan was published.

On 30 March, the Government announced a phased easing of restrictions from Monday 12 April. On 29 April, the Government announced a reopening plan for the country throughout May and June from 10 May, with a further reopening planned announced on 31 August that would see all remaining COVID-19 restrictions in Ireland eased by 22 October.

After a fourth wave of COVID-19 arrived in Ireland in October, the Government published on 19 October a revised plan for the easing of restrictions, with nightclubs allowed to reopen, however the continued use of masks, vaccine certificates and social distancing measures would remain in place until at least February 2022. On 3 December, the Government reintroduced a series of measures that would commence from 7 December amid concerns of the Omicron variant, with nightclubs to close, indoor cultural and sporting events to operate at 50% capacity and a maximum of four households allowed to meet indoors.

The Omicron variant caused a fifth wave of COVID-19 to arrive in late December and early January 2022, with record levels of cases reported over the Christmas and New Year period. As cases began to fall sharply, Taoiseach Micheál Martin announced on 21 January the easing of almost all COVID-19 restrictions, with the requirements of vaccine certificates and social distancing to end, restrictions on household visits and capacity limits for indoor and outdoor events to end, nightclubs to reopen and pubs and restaurants to resume normal trading times, while rules on isolation and the wearing of masks would remain. Remaining restrictions were agreed to be removed from 28 February, with mask wearing in schools, indoor retail settings and on public transport to be voluntary, restrictions in schools to end and testing to be scaled back.

Italy

On 9 March 2020, the government of Italy under Prime Minister Giuseppe Conte imposed a national quarantine, restricting the movement of the population except for necessity, work, and health circumstances, in response to the growing outbreak of COVID-19 in the country. Additional lockdown restrictions mandated the temporary closure of non-essential shops and businesses. This followed a restriction announced on the previous day which affected sixteen million people in the whole region of Lombardy and in fourteen largely-neighbouring provinces in Emilia-Romagna, Veneto, Piedmont and Marche, and prior to that a smaller-scale lockdown of ten municipalities in the province of Lodi and one in the province of Padua that had begun in late February. The restrictions were loosened in May 2020.
 
The lockdown measures, despite being widely approved by the public opinion, were also described as the largest suppression of constitutional rights in the history of the republic. Nevertheless, Article 16 of the Constitution states that travel restrictions may be established for reasons of health or security.

Malaysia

Malaysia introduced the nationwide Movement Control Order (MCO) on 18 March 2020, which was initially announced to last to 14 April but was extended several times. The MCO prohibited mass gatherings, movement within the country, and most industries and all education institutions were ordered to close. Extended Movement Control Orders (EMCO) were implemented in areas where suspected superspreading events or widespread transmission had occurred. The Royal Malaysian Police were mobilized to enforce restrictions. These restrictions were later eased under the "Conditional MCO" (CMCO), which maintained some restrictions on assembly and movement but allowed some sectors to reopen which was later further relaxed to the "Recovery MCO" (RMCO) nationwide. Localized CMCOs restrictions were introduced in the states of Sabah and Selangor were later introduced in response to outbreaks in those states. The MCO was reinstated nationwide in January 2021.

Myanmar 

In September 2020, Myanmar introduced a strict stay-at-home order and cordon sanitaire for the entirety of the country's largest city Yangon amid a major local outbreak. All non-essential businesses were ordered to close. The city's 4 million residents were given less than 24 hours notice before the lockdown came into effect.

Myanmar's State Administration Council announced a nationwide lockdown in July 2021 in response to an increase in cases and deaths.

Namibia

Beginning 27 March 2020, a 21-day lockdown of the regions of Erongo and Khomas was announced. On 14 April 2020 the lockdown was extended to 4 May. It now officially applied to all regions, although the stay-at-home order was already enforced countrywide. Only essential businesses remained open. Schools were closed, parliamentary sessions suspended, and generally all gatherings of more than 10 people were prohibited. Formal and informal bars were closed and the sale of alcohol prohibited. This "stage 1" of the lockdown was in force until 4 May 2020. From then on, regulations are to be gradually eased.

Nepal

Netherlands 

A lockdown in the Netherlands began on 19 December 2021 which is expected to last (at least) until 14 January 2022.

New Zealand

On 23 March 2020, Prime Minister Jacinda Ardern raised New Zealand's COVID-19 alert level to three and announced the closure of all schools beginning on that day, and two days later moved to four at 11:59 p.m. on 25 March 2020 – a nationwide lockdown. While all sporting matches and events as well as non-essential services such as pools, bars, cafes, restaurants, playgrounds closed, essential services such as supermarkets, petrol stations, and health services remained open.

The alert level was moved back down to Level 3 at 11:59 pm on 27 April, and moved to Level 2 at 11:59 pm on 13 May, lifting the rest of the lockdown restrictions while maintaining physical distancing. On 8 June, Prime Minister Ardern announced that New Zealand would be entering into Alert Level 1 at midnight on 9 June, lifting restrictions on daily life, business activities, mass gatherings and public transportation. However, the country's borders would remain closed to most international travel.

Following a new outbreak consisting of four cases of community transmission in Auckland on 11 August, the Government placed the Auckland Region on a Level 3 lockdown from 12:00 am on 12 August while the rest of the country move to Level 2 at the same time. On 30 August, Prime Minister Ardern announced that Auckland would enter into "Alert Level 2.5" from 11:59pm on that night while the rest of the country would remain on Level 2. Under Level 2.5, all social gatherings including birthday parties will be limited to ten people; masks will be mandatory for all Aucklanders using public transportation; and aged care facilities will be operating under strict conditions. The only public gatherings allowed in Auckland are funerals and tangihanga, which will be limited to 50 people.

A new community case of COVID-19 in New Zealand was reported on 17 August 2021, after many months without one. In response, the Government took the country to a full nationwide Alert Level 4 lockdown beginning the following day. One week later, that lockdown remained in place as community case numbers for this community outbreak of the Delta variant reached 148.

Nigeria

Nigeria announced a lockdown in early 2020 that lasted for two weeks, beginning on 30 March and ending on 12 April.

North Korea 

In May 2022, North Korean leader Kim Jong-un declared a national emergency and strict lockdown in response to the first confirmed COVID-19 cases in the country.

Pakistan

In March 2020, Pakistan announced a lockdown that lasted until May.

Philippines

Russia

Singapore

South Africa

Thailand

United Kingdom

United States

Stay-at-home orders in the United States have come from several states and a large number of local jurisdictions, sometimes leading to conflicts between different levels of government and a patchwork of inconsistent dates and rules.

On 15 March 2020, Puerto Rico governor Wanda Vázquez Garced signed an executive order to order all citizens to stay home starting at 9 p.m. with exceptions in limited circumstances between 5 a.m. and 9 pm. Governmental operations and non-essential businesses were to be closed until 30 March.

The first order within the states was simultaneously imposed by health authorities in heart of the San Francisco Bay Area (Alameda, Contra Costa, Marin, San Mateo, and Santa Clara counties and the cities of San Francisco and Berkeley) effective 17 March 2020, affecting nearly 6.7 million people. Other cities and counties across the state followed suit over the next two days, until Gavin Newsom, the governor of California, issued a state-wide order effective 19 March 2020.

On 20 March 2020, New York governor Andrew Cuomo announced the state-wide stay-at-home order with a mandate for remote work effective 22 March. Illinois governor J. B. Pritzker followed that lead on the same day with a state-wide order which would go into effect on 21 March at 5 pm. Ned Lamont, the governor of Connecticut, signed an executive order called "Stay Safe, Stay At Home" to take effect state-wide on 23 March at 8 p.m.

On 20 March 2020, Navajo Nation announced that it had broadened the stay-at-home order to cover the entire reservation, the largest in the country.

On 21 March 2020, New Jersey governor Phil Murphy announced a state-wide stay-at-home order effective at 9 p.m. on the same day.

On 22 March 2020, Ohio governor Mike DeWine and Ohio Department of Health director Amy Acton issued a state-wide stay-at-home order effective 23 March. In the afternoon, the Louisiana governor John Bel Edwards announced a state-wide stay-at-home order in a press conference. Delaware governor John Carney followed suit with a stay-at-home order for his state.

On 23 March 2020, several state governors announced their state-wide stay-at-home order:

 Massachusetts governor Charlie Baker ordered non-essential businesses to close in-person operations effective 24 March until 7 April and directed the Massachusetts Department of Public Health to issue a stay-at-home advisory.
 Michigan governor Gretchen Whitmer announced her state-wide executive order to stay-at-home at 11:00 am for all non-essential businesses effective 24 March until 28 May. 
 Indiana governor Eric Holcomb announced state-wide stay-at-home order effective 25 March until 7 April. 
 West Virginia governor Jim Justice ordered non-essential businesses to be closed immediately, and stay-at-home order effective at 8 pm. 
 After growing calls from local officials on Sunday, Oregon governor Kate Brown issued a stay-at-home order on Monday effective immediately with class C misdemeanor charges for violators. 
 New Mexico governor Michelle Lujan Grisham announced a state-wide stay-at-home order that required remote work effective 24 March until 10 April.
 Washington governor Jay Inslee signed a state-wide stay-at-home proclamation and ordered to close non-essential businesses effective 25 March for two weeks.
 Hawaii governor David Ige issued a state-wide stay-at-home order effective 25 March which was similar to the orders that were previously issued for Maui and Honolulu counties.

On 23 March 2020, Yakama Nation announced its "Stay Home, Stay Healthy" order.

On 24 March 2020, Wisconsin governor Tony Evers issued a state-wide stay-at-home order to close all non-essential businesses and ordered no gatherings of any size effective 25 March until 24 April. Vermont governor Phil Scott signed a stay-at-home order and directed closure of in-person operations of non-essential businesses effective 25 March until 15 April.

On 25 March, Idaho governor Brad Little and Minnesota governor Tim Walz issued stay-at-home orders for their respective states. Colorado Governor Jared Polis issued a stay at home order effective on Thursday the 26th at 6 a.m. through 11 April 2020.

On 1 April, Florida governor Ron DeSantis issued a stay-at-home order effective Friday, 3 April 2020 until the end of the month. On 2 April, Georgia governor Brian Kemp issued a stay-at-home order effective Friday, 3 April 2020, until Monday, 13 April 2020. It overrules any local stay-at-home restrictions previously in place, and instructs residents to stay at home unless they're conducting "essential services," meaning either traveling to and from jobs or other exceptions, including buying groceries; purchasing medical equipment; going out to exercise; and visiting medical facilities. The same day, Dr. Anthony Fauci publicly questioned why all states were not under stay-at-home orders.

In late May 2020, citywide curfews were enacted in San Francisco and several surrounding cities; San Jose; Minneapolis; Atlanta; Chicago; Cleveland; Columbus; Denver; Jacksonville, FL; Los Angeles; Memphis, TN; Omaha, Nebraska; Lincoln, Nebraska; Pittsburgh, Philadelphia; Portland; Salt Lake City; San Antonio; Buffalo, New York; Rochester, NY; Syracuse; New York City; Milwaukee; Seattle; Cincinnati; Indianapolis, Indiana; Fayetteville; Raleigh, North Carolina; Charleston, SC; Sacramento, CA; Columbia, SC; and Asheville, NC due to protests regarding the murder of George Floyd. Countywide curfews were enacted for Los Angeles County, California and Alameda County, California as well. Arizona enacted a state-wide curfew. These curfews are imposed as complemented to stay-at-home order that imposed by state or local authorities.

On 2 November 2020, Massachusetts governor Charlie Baker issued a night-time stay-at-home advisory and business curfew effective 6 November 2020.

Vietnam

Nationwide isolation

Da Nang

Ho Chi Minh city and southern provinces

Countries and territories without lockdowns

Most countries and territories affected with COVID-19 introduced and enforced some form of lockdown. However, only a few exceptions included Japan, South Korea and Taiwan, which rapidly and consistently implemented highly organized mass testing, contact tracing, public messaging and selective quarantining to identify and isolate outbreaks. South Korea's K-Quarantine system was praised in international media for its effectiveness. Authorities in Tokyo, the capital of Japan, advised businesses to close and the population to stay at home, but did not have legal authority to enforce a lockdown or penalise non-compliance. Compliance with advice was nevertheless high.

In the European Union, the only nation not following this strategy is Sweden. Led by its state epidemiologist Anders Tegnell measures in Sweden included the closing of universities and high schools and asking older and at-risk residents to avoid social contact, while keeping restaurants, primary schools and kindergartens open and not mandating face masks. However, in early 2021, new laws permitting lockdown were enacted and Prime Minister Stefan Löfven warned that a lockdown was being considered. As of November 2021, a national lockdown had not been announced. However certain regions of Sweden have declared their own lockdowns to help slow the rate of infection. The region of Uppsala reported 908 cases per 100,000 people over a two-week period compared to a national average of 772 in early April 2021. This caused the Health Chief of the region, Mikael Köhler, to ask individuals within the region to "act as if they were in a personal lockdown."

Some of the countries that did not enact lockdowns during 2020, did so later in the pandemic. In Malawi, a proposed lockdown by the government was delayed by the High Court throughout 2020, until a state of emergency was declared and the country entered a lockdown in January 2021 in response to a worsening outbreak. Although Cambodia restricted movement within the country during a period in 2020, it introduced its first major restrictions, including a curfew and later a stay-at-home order in the capital Phnom Penh, during its largest outbreak to date in early 2021. East Timor also enacted its first lockdown of its capital Dili in March 2021 and Turkey entered its first nationwide lockdown in April 2021.

Two states in Brazil and several others in the United States did not introduce any lockdown-type measures (commonly known as "stay-at-home orders").

Notes

References 

Articles containing video clips
lockdowns
 
Curfews
Emergency management
Country lockdowns
Public health
Quarantine